Automated Logic Corporation is located in Kennesaw, Georgia, United States and manufactures building automation systems.

Several of its technological innovations include: the WebCTRL® building automation system;  Environmental Index™ tool;  Thermographic Color Floor Plans;  Time-lapse™ Graphics;  Fault Detection and Diagnostics (FDD);  EIKON, a uniquely powerful, universal programming tool;  I/O Hardware including controllers and routers.

WebCTRL is a BACnet native, Browser-based building automation system  through which users can fully access their buildings' schedules, setpoints, trends, alarms, and other control functions from virtually any computer, anywhere in the world.  Users can also control their buildings with WebCTRL from wireless devices such as a tablets and cell phones.  WebCTRL supports multiple languages simultaneously and includes a powerful spreadsheet-based reporting tool.  A native BACnet system, WebCTRL interfaces with LonWorks, Modbus and many other protocols to provide an integrated solution to building control needs. WebCTRL is certified by the BACnet Testing Laboratory as BACnet Advanced Workstation Software.

Automated Logic systems are installed in commercial office buildings, industrial plants, critical mission facilities, healthcare facilities, educational facilities, government complexes, hospitality/entertainment venues and retail locations worldwide.

Products are sold through an international network of dealers who design, engineer, install and support Automated Logic products. Automated Logic Corporation was acquired by the Carrier Corporation (parent: United Technologies Corporation.) in 2004.

As a founding member of the BACnet Manufacturers Association, Automated Logic was one of the first to offer products using the industry’s standard protocol – BACnet.

References

External links
 Official Website
 United Technologies
 Mechatronic Solutions
 Time-lapse™ Graphics
 Fault Detection and Diagnostics (FDD)
  WebCTRL® building automation system
 EIKON® Software Graphical Control Programming Designed by Mechanical Engineers
 CtrlSpecBuilder: Provides specifying engineers with a free on-line tool that makes it easy to create bid specifications for HVAC Control Systems.

Building automation
Manufacturing companies based in Georgia (U.S. state)
Web services
Companies based in Cobb County, Georgia